Goat Rocks is a mountain in Dukes County, Massachusetts. Whiting Hill is located southwest of Goat Rocks.

References

Mountains of Massachusetts
Mountains of Dukes County, Massachusetts